The Great Seal of the State of Mississippi was adopted in 2014, replacing a previous version that was used since the 19th century.

Design
The eagle is positioned in the center of the seal, with its wings spread wide and its head held high. Stars and stripes adorn its chest. In its talons, the eagle grasps an olive branch symbolizing a desire for peace and a quiver of arrows representing the power to wage war. The outer circle of the seal contains the text "The Great Seal of the State of Mississippi" at the top and the words "In God We Trust" at the bottom. The governor of Mississippi is tasked by the constitution with safeguarding the seal.

History
The first Mississippian governmental seal was adopted on January 19, 1798, when it was organized under the name of the Mississippi Territory.

After it became a state in 1817, the same seal was designated as the state's seal the following year. In July 2014, Mississippi adopted a new seal, which is still in use today.

On January 31, 2014, purportedly to defend religious freedom, Mississippi's state senate voted to add the words, "In God We Trust" to the state seal and the change was unilaterally made effective on July 1, 2014.

See also

List of Mississippi state symbols
Coat of arms of Mississippi
Flag of Mississippi

References

External links

Symbols of Mississippi
United States state seals
Coats of arms with eagles
Coats of arms with stars
Coats of arms with arrows
Coats of arms with olive branches
Religion in the United States